The pages below contain lists of television stations in the U.S. by call sign.

Historically, stations to the east of the Mississippi River were given call signs beginning with the letter W, stations to the west K. However, there are exceptions. See the article on North American call signs for more information.

 List of television stations in the United States by call sign (initial letter K)
 List of television stations in the United States by call sign (initial letter W)

See also

 Big Three television networks
 Cable television in the United States
 Communications in the United States
 Fourth television network
 High-definition television in the United States
 List of Spanish-language television networks in the United States
 List of United States cable and satellite television networks
 List of United States over-the-air television networks
 List of United States television markets
 Satellite television in the United States
 Television in the United States
 Television news in the United States
 United States cable news